The 2011 Northern Arizona Lumberjacks football team represented Northern Arizona University as a member of the Big Sky Conference during the 2011 NCAA Division I FCS football season . The Lumberjacks were led by 14th-year head coach Jerome Souers and played their home games at the Walkup Skydome. They finished the season with an overall record of 4–7 and a mark of 3–5 in conference play, tying for sixth  place in Big Sky.

Schedule

References

Northern Arizona
Northern Arizona Lumberjacks football seasons
Northern Arizona Lumberjacks football